Frank Fafara (a.k.a. Frank Fara) was a teen rocker in the late 1950s and early 1960s in Phoenix, Arizona where he achieved regional fame. As an adult he changed his last name to "Fara" and toured across North America with his Country music road show, The Frank Fara Show featuring Patty Parker. After touring for five years, he and Parker married and founded Comstock Records, an independent American record label.

Teen Idol 
In the late 1950s, Frank and his school friend and lead guitarist, Richard Meyer, started out playing for high school rallies.  Their popularity soon came to the attention of Arizona Republic music columnist Jack Curtis, who set up their first recording session. The  original recording included Richard Meyer on lead guitar, Jim Schultz on drums, Frank on rhythm guitar, and Al Casey on bass.

Fafara had a string of successful Rock ‘n Roll releases in Arizona from 1959 to 1964.  His first recording, “Only in My Dreams” went to #5 on the Phoenix Top Ten radio charts.  A series of releases followed including “Miss You Dee”, “Lovemaker, Lovebreaker” and “Golden One”.  F rank Fafara recorded at the same studio as Duane Eddy, Waylon Jennings, Sanford Clark, and Wayne Newton.  Cashbox’s national review noted that “Fafara has something of the late Buddy Holly in his light beat delivery”. Billboard Magazine gave him their highest 3 star rating.

Frank Fafara performed shows across Arizona with other top rockers of his day including the Everly Brothers, Conway Twitty, Brenda Lee and Del Shannon.  He also appeared regularly at Stage 7, a popular Phoenix teen club.  Frank appeared as a regular on KPHO’s Saturday night TV show Teen Beat, as well as performing on The Wallace and Ladmo Show. On television, Frank was usually backed up by lead guitarist Mike Condello & the Stage 7 combo, while other shows normally featured Bob Knisley or Fred Allard on lead guitar.

The Frank Fara Show featuring Patty Parker 
As an adult, Fafara changed his last name to "Fara" and moved to California, where he put together a country music road show. The band was originally named The Frank Fara Show, but due to his drummer's (Patty Parker) popularity and charismatic stage presence, they changed the name to The Frank Fara Show featuring Patty Parker. For five years, Fara and Parker toured the Nevada casino circuit and major venues across North America. They eventually married, stopped touring, and began working behind the scenes in the studio.

Co-Founder of Comstock Records 
In 1978, Fara and Parker founded Comstock Records, an independent American record label. Fara was responsible for marketing and promotions, and Parker was the producer. Their office was originally located in Shawnee, Kansas, but they used Nashville studios and Nashville musicians to record and produce their songs. Parker was one of the first female independent Country music producers in the nation. Comstock found their niche in the music business by producing Country music albums for international artists. In 1988, Comstock Records moved their office to Scottsdale, Arizona, but continued to produce and record in Nashville. In the 1980s and 1990s, Comstock's success caught the attention of Billboard, The Wall Street Journal, and many local newspapers across North America.  In 1998, after two decades of achieving charting success and international music awards, the ECMA awarded Comstock Records "Indie Label of the Year."

In 1986, Fara wrote the book, How to Open Doors in the Music Industry the Independent Way.

Legacy 
In the 2000s, Fafara’s masters were found at Audio Recorders, the studio which made Phoenix a major recording hub during the fifties & sixties. Frank wrote all of his own songs and they were put out on MCI Records and Mascot Records.  The songs were leased to Del-Fi Records, the same label as Richie Valens, but were never released nationally.  In 2006, all the original Phoenix recordings from 1959 - 1964 of Fafara were completely digitized and released by Comstock Records on a CD titled Only In My Dreams.

Much of Fara's and Comstock's catalog resides with independent record label, Fervor Records, which has placed many of his songs in TV and film.

Discography

TV and Film Placements

References

External links
 Comstock Records: Frank Fafara - Former Arizona Teen Rocker

American male singers
Year of birth missing (living people)
Living people
Musicians from Phoenix, Arizona
Place of birth missing (living people)
Singers from Arizona
Record labels based in Arizona